Carlos Omar Delgado (7 February 1949 – 1 December 2002) is an Ecuadorian footballer. He played in six matches for the Ecuador national football team from 1975 to 1983. He was also part of Ecuador's squad for the 1975 Copa América tournament.

References

External links
 

1949 births
2002 deaths
Ecuadorian footballers
Ecuador international footballers
Sportspeople from Esmeraldas, Ecuador
Association football goalkeepers
C.S. Emelec footballers
C.D. El Nacional footballers
S.D. Quito footballers
L.D.U. Portoviejo footballers